Manuel Gera (born 1963) is a German church musician and organist.

Gera studied Protestant church music at the Robert Schumann Hochschule Düsseldorf. His teachers included Hartmut Schmidt (choir conducting), Hans-Dieter Möller (organ) and Gustav Adolf Krieg (organ improvisation). After postgraduate studies at the Hochschule für Musik Saar with Daniel Roth and Theo Brandmüller, he completed the Konzertexamen in 1995 in the subject . Also in 1995, he was awarded third prize at the Festival Europäische Kirchenmusik in Schwäbisch Gmünd.

After working as a cantor in Oberhausen and Soest, he was appointed to St. Michael's Church, Hamburg in 2001. There, he served as organist and choirmaster until 2021. In 2006, he was appointed church music director by the church leadership of North Elbian Evangelical Lutheran Church.

The main focus of his activity is organ improvisation. Together with his wife Anne-Katrin, he conceives organ concerts for children.

Compositions 
 Credo novum (2005)
 Engel-Triptychon (2006)
 Missa de Angelis (2007)

References

External links 
 
 Daniel Kaiser: Organist Manuel Gera verlässt Hamburger Michel. Norddeutscher Rundfunk, 31 March 2021.

German classical organists
1963 births
Living people
Place of birth missing (living people)